Road signs in Mauritius are standardised traffic signs used in Mauritius according to the Traffic Signs Regulations 1990. They are heavily modelled on road signs in the United Kingdom, since Mauritius is a former British colony. Mauritius has left-hand traffic.

Signing system 
The traffic sign are divided into three classes; circles gives orders, triangles warns of possible dangers and rectangles gives information. Different colours are use within these shapes; blue circles are mandatory signs, it gives positive instructions, while red circles are prohibitory signs, it give negative instructions. Blue rectangles give general information while green rectangles are use for direction sign on main roads. However, there are three exception for these shapes and colour rules; that is the octagonal Stop sign, the diamond priority road sign and the inverted red triangle Give way sign.

Warning signs 
Warning signs indicates a hazard ahead on the road that may not be readily apparent to a driver.

Priority signs 
Priority signs are intended to instruct road users on what they must or should do (or not do) under a given set of circumstances.

Prohibitiory signs 
Prohibitory signs are used to prohibit certain types of manoeuvres or some types of traffic. The No symbol surrounding a pictogram is used to indicate something that is not permitted.

Mandatory signs 
Mandatory signs are used to set the obligations of all traffic which use a specific area of road. Unlike prohibitory or restrictive signs, mandatory signs tell traffic what it must do, rather than must not do.

Information signs 
Information signs informs people.

Miscellaneous signs

References 

road signs
Mauritius